Chad "Chuck" Clements (born August 29, 1973) is a former American football quarterback who played one season with the New York Jets of the National Football League (NFL). He was drafted by the New York Jets in the sixth round of the 1997 NFL Draft. He played college football at the University of Houston and attended Huntsville High School in Huntsville, Texas. He was also a member of the Philadelphia Eagles, Denver Broncos, Berlin Thunder, Las Vegas Outlaws and Ottawa Renegades. Clements was drafted fifth overall by the Las Vegas Outlaws in the 2001 XFL Draft but, because of a preseason injury, never played for them.

References

External links
Just Sports Stats
College stats
Las Vegas Outlaws profile
Totalfootballstats.com
Eagles cut Clements
Broncos waive Clements

Living people
1973 births
Players of American football from Texas
American football quarterbacks
Canadian football quarterbacks
American players of Canadian football
Houston Cougars football players
New York Jets players
Philadelphia Eagles players
Denver Broncos players
Berlin Thunder players
Las Vegas Outlaws (XFL) players
Ottawa Renegades players
People from Kingsville, Texas
People from Huntsville, Texas